St. Pete Beach (formerly called St. Petersburg Beach) is a coastal city in Pinellas County, Florida. Known as a tourist destination, St. Pete Beach was formed from the towns of Pass-a-Grille, Belle Vista, St. Petersburg Beach and unincorporated Pinellas County.The population was 9,346 at the 2010 census.

St. Pete Beach's downtown is centered on Corey Avenue. This district contains bars, restaurants and shopping and retail outlets. The Pass-a-Grille Historic District and the historic Don CeSar beach resort are located at the southern end of the beach. Recently, TripAdvisor named St. Pete Beach the No. 1 beach in America in 2021 and no. 5 best beach in the world.

History
The town of St. Pete Beach was consolidated from the municipalities of Pass-a-Grille, Don CeSar Place, Belle Vista and St. Petersburg Beach in a 1957 referendum, in which consolidation only won by a margin of 5 votes.  At the time of its incorporation in 1957, its name was St. Petersburg Beach. On March 9, 1994, locals voted to officially change the name to the shorter version of St. Pete Beach, to distinguish it from the city of St. Petersburg a few miles to the east.

Geography
St. Pete Beach is located at  (27.724587, –82.741850).

St. Pete Beach occupies the entire space of Long Key, a barrier island at the east central edge of the Gulf of Mexico. Three bridges lead into the city, connecting it to Treasure Island, South Pasadena and the Bayway Isles area of St. Petersburg.

Demographics

As of the census of 2000, there were 9,929 people, 5,294 households, and 2,726 families residing in the city. The racial makeup of the city was 97.61% White, 0.66% African American, 0.55% Asian, 0.22% Native American, 0.03% Pacific Islander, 0.34% from other races, and 0.57% from two or more races. Hispanic or Latino of any race were 2.51% of the population. St. Pete Beach has the largest proportion of residents who are Lithuanian-American in Florida (3.3 percent).

There were 5,294 households, out of which 10.4% had children under the age of 18 living with them, 44.2% were married couples living together, 5.3% had a female householder with no husband present, and 48.5% were non-families. 40.6% of all households were made up of individuals, and 18.1% had someone living alone who was 65 years of age or older.  The average household size was 1.82 and the average family size was 2.40.

In the city, the population was spread out, with 9.7% under the age of 18, 3.3% from 18 to 24, 22.6% from 25 to 44, 31.3% from 45 to 64, and 33.1% who were 65 years of age or older.  The median age was 54 years. For every 100 females, there were 99.3 males.  For every 100 females age 18 and over, there were 97.9 males.

The median income for a household in the city was $47,574, and the median income for a family was $61,434. Males had a median income of $40,938 versus $30,532 for females. The per capita income for the city was $35,514.  About 3.7% of families and 7.4% of the population were below the poverty line, including 9.5% of those under age 18 and 4.6% of those age 65 or over.

Education

Residents are zoned to Pinellas County Schools, the specific school they are zoned for include Azalea Elementary School, Madeira Beach Middle School, and Boca Ciega High School.

In 1915 Sunshine Elementary School opened in Pass-a-Grille. Gulf Beaches Elementary opened in 1950. The Tampa Bay Times said that Gulf Beaches "quickly absorbed most of the kids from Sunshine". Sunshine Elementary School closed on June 6, 1975. The Gulf Beaches School absorbed the traditions of the Sunshine school, including the fish broil fundraiser.

On January 14, 2009, the Pinellas County school board voted 7–0 to close several schools, including Gulf Beaches Elementary School. When the school was in operation, it had annual fish broils. Linda Chaney, the commissioner of St. Pete Beach, and Mary Maloof, the mayor of Treasure Island, had asked the school board not to close Gulf Beaches. In addition the year-round population of children had decreased. In 2014, the Pinellas County School Board announced Gulf Beaches would be reopened for the 2014–2015 school year as a technology magnet school.

Library

The St. Pete Beach Public Library is the public library that serves the city of St. Pete Beach and the greater Pinellas area. The library was founded in 1951 by the St. Petersburg Beach Community Club inside their clubhouse with “450 books on two shelves”. The library grew to include “200 adult and 200 children’s books” from the Florida State Library Extension Service.

In 1957 it became a municipal library when the city of St. Pete Beach was incorporated allowing the St. Petersburg Beach Community Club to turn operations over to the city. In 1968 the Friends of the St. Pete Beach Public Library was formed raising over $26,000 for a new library building.

On July 7, 1969 the St. Pete Beach Library opened an 8,200 square foot building by architect Glenn Q. Johnson at 365 73rd Avenue. The building was partially refurbished in 1995, and underwent a major renovation in 2020–2021.  A member of the Pinellas Public Library Cooperative since 1989, the library was temporarily relocated to 7470 Gulf Boulevard during the renovation. On March 26, 2021 the St. Pete Beach Library reopened after a $2.6 million restoration and renovation.

Tourism

St. Pete Beach is a seaside tourist destination.

The Don CeSar is a renowned historical hotel, opened in 1928, located on the Gulf shore in St. Pete Beach.

Notable people

 Chuck Hiller, baseball player

References

External links

City of St. Pete Beach official website

1957 establishments in Florida
Cities in Pinellas County, Florida
Populated places established in 1957
Cities in Florida
Populated coastal places in Florida on the Gulf of Mexico
Beaches of Pinellas County, Florida
Beaches of Florida